Fred Wesley Wentworth (August 3, 1864 – October 5, 1943) was an American architect known for his many buildings in Downtown Paterson, New Jersey as well as several residences and theaters in northeastern New Jersey. Wentworth had a major impact on shaping Paterson after a wind-driven fire decimated much of the central business district in 1902. His body of work consisted of institutional, commercial, residential, religious and healthcare buildings as well as some of the nation's first movie theaters designed exclusively for motion pictures. He was a Fellow of the American Institute of Architects.

Background and education 
Wentworth was born August 3, 1864, in Boxborough, Massachusetts and raised in Dover, New Hampshire. He graduated Dartmouth College in 1889 with a degree in architecture. He married Florence Agnes Marie Hurlburt on May 9, 1893. They had no children. He died on October 5, 1943 and is interred in Pine Hill Cemetery in Dover.

Downtown Paterson 

Wentworth worked in Paterson between 1888 and 1943. It was a small manufacturing town when he arrived but grew rapidly and its population nearly tripled during the time he was there. He designed many of the new property types needed, the post office, the court house, movie theatres, parking garages, aeronautics factories and other commercial buildings. In 1902 a fire devastated most of the center of the city and Wentworth was responsible for much of the rebuilding work needed afterwards. He designed numerous buildings some in collaboration with his draftsman and later partner Frederick J. Vreeland. Many fall within the Downtown Commercial Historic District.

United States Post Office (1899)
Passaic County Courthouse (1902), supervising architect
Walton Building (1903), 121 Ellison Street
First National Bank Building (1910), Elliison Street
Elbow Building (1913), 242-244 Main Street
Gerstley Building (1913) 160 Main Street
Barnert Hospital (1914) Broadway, demolished
622 Main Street (1920)
Kitay Building (1920s)
 Masonic Temple (1923) 385-405 Broadway
Alexander Hamilton Hotel (1925), 39-55 Church Street
Alexander Hamilton Garage, demolished
YM-YWHA Building (1925), Van Houten Street
 Fabian Building (1926), 31-51 Church Street
Paterson General Hospital (1926), demolished
YMCA Building (1929) 128 Ward Street
Paterson Evening News Building

Other public buildings 

Public School #10, Paterson
Public School #13, Paterson
Passaic County Tuberculosis Sanitarium (1928), aka Preakness Hospital Preakness, abandoned 2009
Passaic County Welfare Home (1936), Haledon and Wayne
Valley View Sanitarium (1927–31), known as the Preakness Building
Nurses Residence, known as Passaic County Juvenile Detention Center
Storage Building
Loomis Sanitarium Library

Religious buildings 
Broadway Baptist Church, Paterson
Temple Emanuel (1929), Eastside Park Historic District, Paterson

Movie theaters 

Wentworth was commissioned to build the several movie theatres by Jacob Fabian including The Regent which was the first facility built exclusively for the exhibition of moving pictures and other  movie palaces. Fabian is recalled in the cinema at City Center Mall, the Fabian 8.
 Regent Theater (1914), Downtown Paterson (demolished)
 Branford Theater (1920), Four Corners, Newark
 Fabian Theater (1925), Downtown, Paterson
 Ritz Theatre (1926), Midtown, Elizabeth
 Stanley Theater (1928), Journal Square, Jersey City

Residences 

 Psi Upsilon Fraternity House (1907), Dartmouth College, Hanover, New Hampshire
Fred Wesley Wentworth House, Eastside Park Historic District, Paterson
John W. Griggs House, Eastside Park Historic District, Paterson
Hobart Manor (1915 expansion) for Garret Hobart, now part of William Paterson University, Wayne, New Jersey
Atwood-Blauvelt mansion (1896–97), Oradell, New Jersey
Casque and Gauntlet addition (1923), Dartmouth College, Hanover, New Hampshire
Lucius Varney House, Dover, New Hampshire

See also 
List of tallest buildings in Paterson
National Register of Historic Places listings in Passaic County, New Jersey

References

External links 
Walking tour Downtown Paterson

The recent work of Fred Wesley Wentworth, Architect, Paterson, New Jersey, 1929

1864 births
1943 deaths
Architects from New Jersey
Defunct architecture firms based in New Jersey
People from Paterson, New Jersey
People from Dover, New Hampshire
Dartmouth College alumni

Fellows of the American Institute of Architects
Burials in New Hampshire
People from Middlesex County, Massachusetts
History of Paterson, New Jersey